Belgium Barbarians is an invitational rugby sevens team. They participate in 7's tournaments all around the world.

Prize list
 Montreal 7's (Canada), September 2022: Finalist Cup
 Tullamore 7's (Ireland), July 2022: Finalist Cup 
 Howard Hinton 7's (France), October 2021: 1/2 Cup Finalist
 New York 7's (USA), November 2019: 3rd 
 Tullamore 7's (Ireland), July 2019: Winner Cup 
 Madrid 7's (Spain), June 2019: 1/4 Finalist Cup
 Borneo 7's (Malaysia), March 2019: 1/4 Finalist Cup
 Tullamore 7's (Ireland), July 2018: 3rd
 Madrid 7's (Spain), June 2018: 3rd
 Benidorm 7's (Spain), May 2018: Winner Plate
 Bornéo 7's (Malaysia), March 2018: Finalist Bowl
 New York 7's (USA), November 2017: Winner Cup 
 Brussels 7's (Belgium), July 2017: Finalist Cup
 Madrid 7's (Spain), June 2017: Winner Plate
 Benidorm 7's (Spain), June 2017: Finalist Cup
 Dublin 7's (Ireland), May 2017: 1/2 Cup Finalist
 Waterloo 7's (Belgium), December 2016: 3rd
 Montreal 7's (Canada), September 2016: Finalist Cup
 Budapest 7's (Hungary), July 2016: Finalist Plate
 Benidorm 7's (Spain), May 2016: 1/2 Cup Finalist
 Gand 7's (Belgium), March 2016: Winner Cup
 Borneo 7's (Malaysia), March 2016: Finalist Bowl
 Dubai 7's (United Arab Emirates), December 2015: Winner Plate
 London 7's (England), July 2015: 1/2 Plate Finalist 
 Montreal 7's (Canada), July 2015: 3rd Plate
 Benidorm 7's (Spain), May 2015: Winner Club Gold Cup
 Montreal 7's (Canada), September 2014: 3rd
 Budapest 7's (Hungary), July 2014: 3rd
 Benidorm 7's (Spain), May 2013: Finalist Plate
 Montreal 7's (Canada), September 2012: Winner Cup
 Athlone 7's (Ireland), August 2012: Finalist Plate
 Brussels 7's (Belgium), July 2012: Winner Cup
 Montreal 7's (Canada), October 2011: Winner Cup
 SOOS 7's (France), June 2011: Finalist Plate
 Benidorm 7's (Spain), May 2011: 1/4 Cup Finalist
 Geneva 7's (Switzerland), April 2011: 1/2 Plate Finalist
 Benidorm 7's (Spain), May 2010: Winner Plate
 Cracovia 7's (Poland), June 2009: Winner Cup
 Amsterdam 7's (Netherlands), May 2009: Finalist Plate
 Nancy 7's (France), April 2009: Bowl Winner
 Borneo 10's (Malaysia), November 2008: 1/2 Plate Finalist
 Paris 7's (France), October 2008: Finalist Cup
 Montreal 7's (Canada), October 2007: Winner Cup
 Tangier 7's (Morocco), May 2007: Finalist Bowl
 Seville 7's (Spain), July 2006: Finalist Plate
 Bangkok 10's (Thailand), February 2006: Winner Cup
 Montreal 7's (Canada), September 2005: Winner Cup
 Brussels 7's (Belgium), August 2005: Winner Cup
 Roma 7's (Italy), June 2005: 1/2 Plate Finalist
 Sofia 7's (Bulgaria), May 2005: Winner Cup
 Tangier 7's (Morocco), March 2005: 3rd
 Punta Del Este 7's (Uruguay), January 2005: Finalist Plate
 Montreal 7's (Canada), September 2004: Finalist Cup
 Kinsale 7's (Ireland), May 2004: 1/4 Cup Finalist
 São Paulo 7's (Brazil), December 2003: Winner Plate
 Bangkok 7's (Thailand), November 2003: 1/2 Bowl Finalist
 Kandy 7's (Sri Lanka), September 2003: Finalist Plate
 Nivelles 7's (Belgium), June 2003: Winner Cup
 Nairobi 7's (Kenya), June 2003: 1/2 Bowl Finalist
 Belgrade 7's (Serbia), June 2003: Winner Cup
 Sofia 7's (Bulgaria), May 2003: Winner Cup
 Euregio 7's (Belgium), April 2003: Winner Cup
 Krusevac 7's (Serbia), August 2002: 3rd
 Nivelles 7's (Belgium), June 2002: Winner Cup
 Benidorm 7's (Spain), May 2002: 1/2 Cup Finalist
 Chiang Mai 7's (Thailand), December 2001: 11th
 Kandy 7's (Sri Lanka), September 2001: 5th
 Nivelles 7's (Belgium), June 2001: Winner Cup
 Holyland 7's (Israel), September 2000: 1/2 Plate Finalist 
 New York 7's (USA), November 1999:  Finalist Cup
 Phuket 7's (Thailand), July 1999: 1/2 Cup Finalist
 Prague 7's (Czech Republic), July 1999: 3rd
 Prague 7's (Czech Republic), July 1998: 3rd
 Prague 7's (Czech Republic), July 1997: 3rd

Emblematic players
 Mathew Hocken 
 Kevin Croke
 Neil Massinon
 Alain Gérard
 Loic Van Der Linden
 Francis N'Tamack
 Julien Berger
 Kevin Corrigan (rugby union)
 Conor Cleary
 Shane Thompson (godfather)
 David Nemsadze
 Johann Bombaerts
 Maxime Carabignac
 Guy Gérard (founding president)

References
 Belgian Barbarians Fizzapapa's Rugby 7s
 Belgium Barbarians
 L’Irlande avant le Canada
 ARTICLES DE PRESSE - Belgium Barbarians
 Les Barbarians terminent en beauté

Belgian rugby union clubs